The IS Open de Tênis was a tennis tournament held in São Paulo, Brazil, in 2012–13 and 2015. The event was part of the ATP Challenger Tour and is played on clay courts.

Past finals

Singles

Doubles

References

External links 
 Official website

 
ATP Challenger Tour
Clay court tennis tournaments
2012 establishments in Brazil
2015 disestablishments in Brazil
Recurring sporting events established in 2012
Recurring sporting events established in 2015
Sport in São Paulo
Tennis tournaments in Brazil